Maurice Matthey was a Swiss rower. He competed in the men's double sculls event at the 1948 Summer Olympics.

References

External links
  

Year of birth missing
Possibly living people
Swiss male rowers
Olympic rowers of Switzerland
Rowers at the 1948 Summer Olympics
Place of birth missing